Salaheddin Bayani was an Iranian politician who served as a member of Parliament of Iran from 1980 to 1984.

Early life and education 
Bayani was born in 1938 in the city of Khaf, Khorasan to Habibollah, a farmer. He obtained a bachelor's degree in law and became a civil servant.

Political career 
Bayani was elected in the 1980 Iranian legislative election. Sympathetic towards President Abolhassan Banisadr, he was the only member of the parliament who spoke in his favor during the impeachment process. He argued that he will vote against the motion, because "the party in power (Islamic Republican Party) did not want Banisadr from the start, but the people did, which is why they gave him 11 million votes and keep supporting him now".

References 

1938 births
People from Khorasan
Office for the Cooperation of the People with the President politicians
Members of the 1st Islamic Consultative Assembly
Year of death missing